Vlad Florin Dumitrescu (born April 8, 1990) is a former Romanian professional basketball player, he played for CSU Asesoft Ploiești, BCM Olimpic Baia Mare, CSM VSK Miercurea Ciuc and CSO Voluntari of the Romanian League.

References

1990 births
Living people
CSU Asesoft Ploiești players
Sportspeople from Ploiești
Romanian men's basketball players
Shooting guards
CSO Voluntari players